Rear Admiral Roger Charles Dimmock,  (27 May 1935 – 6 May 2014) was a Royal Navy officer who served as Naval Secretary from 1985 to 1987.

Naval career
Educated at Price's School, Dimmock joined the Royal Navy in 1953 and specialised in naval aviation. He went on to be Director of Naval Air Warfare at the Ministry of Defence in 1983, Director of Naval Staff Duties from January to February 1985 then later Naval Secretary in 1985 and Flag Officer Naval Air Command in 1987. He retired in 1989.

Family and later life
In 1958 Dimmock married Lesley Patricia Reid; they had three daughters.

Dimmock laid the wreath at the Remembrance Day Service at Fareham in November 2005. He died on 6 May 2014.

References

1935 births
2014 deaths
Companions of the Order of the Bath
People from Fareham
Royal Navy rear admirals